The 1996 Australia rugby union tour was a series of rugby union matches played between 19 October and 7 December 1996 in Europe by the Australia national rugby union team.

Results
Scores and results list Australia's points tally first.

In Italy

 Italy: 15. Javier Pertile, 14. Massimo Ravazzolo, 13. Ivan Francescato, 12. Stefano Bordon, 11. Leandro Manteri, 10. Diego Dominguez, 9. Alessandro Troncon, 8. Orazio Arancio, 7. Andrea Sgorlon, 6. Massimo Giovanelli (capt.), 5. Diego Scaglia, 4. Walter Cristofoletto, 3. Franco Properzi-Curti, 2. Carlo Orlandi, 1. Mauro dal Sie, replacements:, Andrea Barattin
Australia : 15. Matt Burke, 14. Tim Horan, 13. Dan Herbert, 12. Pat Howard, 11. David Campese, 10. David Knox, 9. George Gregan, 8. Mike Brial, 7. David Wilson, 6. Daniel Manu, 5. John Eales (capt.), 4. John Welborn, 3. Andrew Heath, 2. Michael Foley, 1. Richard Harry, replacements:, Brett Robinson, Jason Little
 David Campese won his 100th cap for Australia.

In Scotland

 Scotland: 15. Rowen Shepherd, 14. Tony Stanger, 13. Gregor Townsend (capt.), 12. Ronnie Eriksson, 11. Kenny Logan, 10. Craig Chalmers, 9. Gary Armstrong, 8. Eric Peters, 7. Ian Smith, 6. Murray Wallace, 5. Doddie Weir, 4. Damian Cronin, 3. Barry Stewart, 2. Kevin McKenzie, 1. Dave Hilton, replacements:, Bryan Redpath, Unused:, Derek Stark, Scott Hastings, Scott Murray, Alan Watt

Australia: 15. Matt Burke, 14. Tim Horan, 13. Dan Herbert, 12. Pat Howard, 11. Joe Roff, 10. David Knox, 9. Sam Payne, 8. Daniel Manu, 7. David Wilson, 6. Owen Finegan, 5. Warwick Waugh, 4. John Eales (capt.), 3. Andrew Blades, 2. Michael Foley, 1. Richard Harry, replacements:, Brett Robinson Unused:, Marco Caputo, Andrew Heath, George Gregan, Richard Tombs, David Campese

In Ireland

 Ireland: 15. Jim Staples, 14. James Topping, 13. Jonny Bell, 12. Mark McCall, 11. Dominic Crotty, 10. Paul Burke, 9. Stephen McIvor, 8. Anthony Foley, 7. Denis McBride, 6. David Corkery, 5. Jeremy Davidson, 4. Gabriel Fulcher, 3. Paul Wallace, 2. Keith Wood (cap.), 1. Nick Popplewell,  substitutes , Maurice Field
Australia: 15. Matt Burke, 14. Jason Little, 13. Dan Herbert, 12. Tim Horan, 11. Joe Roff, 10. David Knox, 9. George Gregan, 8. Mike Brial, 7. David Wilson, 6. Daniel Manu, 5. John Eales (cap.), 4. Warwick Waugh, 3. Andrew Blades, 2. Michael Foley, 1. Dan Crowley,  substitutes:, Brett Robinson

In Wales

 Wales: 15. Wayne Proctor, 14. Ieuan Evans, 13. Scott Gibbs, 12. Gareth Thomas, 11. Dafydd James, 10. Jonathan Davies, 9. Rob Howley, 8. Steve Williams, 7. Kingsley Jones, 6. Hemi Taylor, 5. Derwyn Jones, 4. Gareth Llewellyn, 3. Dai Young, 2. Jonathan Humphreys (cap.), 1. Christian Loader, sostituti:, Colin Charvis, Neil Jenkins, Craig Quinnell
Australia : 15. Matt Burke, 14. Joe Roff, 13. Jason Little, 12. Tim Horan(cap.), 11. David Campese, 10. Pat Howard, 9. George Gregan, 8. Mike Brial, 7. David Wilson, 6. Owen Finegan, 5. David Giffin, 4. Tim Gavin, 3. Andrew Blades, 2. Michael Foley, 1. Dan Crowley

The match against Barbarians

Barbarians: 15. T Stimpson , (Joel Stransky 22' ), 14 N Walker , 13 A Bateman , 12 Gregor Townsend , (M Allen 73' ), 11 T Underwood , 10 Rob Andrew (capt) , 9 R Howley , (A Moore 59' ), 8 S Quinnell , (D. Weir 79'  ), 7 Neil Back , 6 D McIntosh , 5 I Jones , 4 C Quinnell , 3 D.Garforth , 2 N. Hewitt , 1 N Popplewell 
Australia: 15. Matt Burke, (Stephen Larkham, 79'), 14. Joe Roff, 13.D Herbert, 12 T Horan (capt), 11. David Campese, 10.P Howard, (R Tombs, 73'), 9. S Payne, 8.M Brial, (B Robinson 23'), 7. D Wilson, 6.O Finnegan, 5. T Gavin, 4. D Giffin, 3. A Blades, (A Heath, 77), 2. M Caputo, (M Foley, 25) 1. D.Crowley,

See also
 History of rugby union matches between Australia and the Barbarians
 History of rugby union matches between Australia and Ireland
 History of rugby union matches between Australia and Italy
 History of rugby union matches between Australia and Scotland
 History of rugby union matches between Australia and Wales

References

1996 rugby union tours
1996
1996
1996
1996
1996 in Australian rugby union
1996–97 in European rugby union
1996–97 in English rugby union
1996–97 in Irish rugby union
1996–97 in Welsh rugby union
1996–97 in Scottish rugby union
1996–97 in Italian rugby union